Leon "Ndugu" Chancler (July 1, 1952 – February 3, 2018) was an American pop, funk, and jazz drummer. He was also a composer, producer, and university professor.

Biography

Early life
Born in Shreveport, Louisiana, on July 1, 1952, Leon Chancler was the youngest of seven children from the union of Rosie Lee and Henry Nathaniel Chancler. In 1960, the family relocated to Los Angeles, California. Chancler began playing drums when he was thirteen years old. He would publicly reminisce about being asked to leave a classroom for continuously tapping on the desk, only to be later heard tapping on the poles in the hallway. His love for the drums took over while attending Gompers Junior High School and it became his lifelong ambition. He graduated from Locke High School, having been involved in playing there with Willie Bobo and the Harold Johnson Sextet, and he later graduated from Cal State Dominguez Hills with a degree in music education.

Musical career
By the time he finished college, Chancler had already performed with jazz artists such as the Gerald Wilson Big Band, Herbie Hancock, and recorded with Miles Davis, Freddie Hubbard, and Bobby Hutcherson.

He recorded frequently as a sideman in jazz, blues, and pop music, including the instantly recognizable drums on Michael Jackson's "Billie Jean". In 1982, he received a Grammy nomination for Best Rhythm & Blues song for co-writing "Let It Whip", made famous by the Dazz Band. Other musicians with whom Chancler worked during his career included George Benson, Stanley Clarke, the Crusaders, George Duke, John Lee Hooker, Hubert Laws, Thelonious Monk, Jean-Luc Ponty, Lionel Richie, Kenny Rogers, Patrice Rushen, Santana, Frank Sinatra, Donna Summer, the Temptations, Tina Turner, and Weather Report.

In 2006, he became an Adjunct Assistant Professor of Jazz Studies at the University of Southern California and  taught at the Stanford Jazz Workshop in California for three weeks every summer. He was a member of the Percussive Arts Society  and was inducted into the PAS Hall of Fame in 2020.

Personal life
Chancler was given the name "Ndugu" by Herbie Hancock during his time with Hancock's Mwandishi band. He was known as Leon (Ndugu) Chancler, or sometimes Ndugu Chancler. Ndugu is Swahili for “earth brother,” a family member or comrade.

Ndugu grew up active in his church and was mentored and influenced by many strong men that helped shape his life after the absence of his father at age 13. His older brother Londell was a major support and motivation to him. When his mother was diagnosed with diabetes, Ndugu cared for her until her death in 1994. Chancler had one child, his son Rashon Chafic Chancler, with Vicki Guess.

Death
Chancler died at his home in Los Angeles on February 3, 2018, of prostate cancer, at the age of 65. A song, "Home Light," written by Ernie Watts and Marc Seales, was dedicated to Chancler. It was the title track of a 2018 album by the Ernie Watts Quartet.

Discography
With George Benson
 Love Remembers (Warner Bros., 1993)
With Dee Dee Bridgewater
 Just Family (Elektra Records, 1977)
With Peabo Bryson
 All My Love (Capitol, 1989)
 Missing You (Concord, 2007)
With Keni Burke
 You're the Best (RCA Records, 1981)
 Changes (RCA Records, 1982)
With Tia Carrere
 Dream (Reprise, 1993)
With Miles Davis
 Miles Davis at Newport 1955-1975: The Bootleg Series Vol. 4 (Columbia Legacy, 2015)
With George Duke
 Faces in Reflection (MPS Records, 1974)
 Feel (MPS Records, 1974)
 The Aura Will Prevail (MPS Records, 1975)
 I Love the Blues, She Heard My Cry (MPS Records, 1975)
 Liberated Fantasies (MPS Records, 1976)
 From Me to You (Epic Records, 1977)
 Reach for It (Epic Records, 1977)
With Sheena Easton
 No Strings (MCA Records, 1993)
With Herbie Hancock
 Mwandishi (Warner Bros., 1971)
With Eddie Harris
 Excursions (Atlantic, 1966–73)
With Hampton Hawes
 Universe (Prestige, 1972)
 Blues for Walls (Prestige, 1973)
With Tramaine Hawkins
To a Higher Place (Columbia, 1994)
With Joe Henderson
 The Elements (Milestone, 1974)
With Jennifer Holliday
 The Song Is You (Shanachie, 2014)
With John Lee Hooker
 The Healer (Chameleon, 1989)
With Michael Jackson
 Thriller (Epic, 1982)
 Bad (Epic, 1987)
With Patti LaBelle
 Tasty (Epic, 1978)
With Labelle
 Chameleon (Epic, 1976)
With Harold Land
 Damisi (Mainstream, 1972)
 Choma (Burn) (Mainstream, 1972)
With Azar Lawrence
 Bridge into the New Age (Prestige, 1974)
With Cheryl Lynn
 Start Over (Manhattan, 1987)
With Wendy Matthews
 The Witness Tree (rooArt, 1994)
With Jean Luc Ponty
 Upon the Wings of Music (Atlantic Records, 1975)
With Julian Priester
 Love, Love (ECM, 1973)
With Weather Report
 Tale Spinnin' (Columbia, 1975)
With Lionel Richie
 Lionel Richie (Motown Records, 1982)
With LeAnn Rimes
 What a Wonderful World (Curb, 2004)
With Minnie Riperton
 Minnie (Capitol, 1979)
With Robbie Robertson
 Storyville (Geffen, 1991)
With Kenny Rogers
 Christmas (Liberty Records, 1981)
 Love Will Turn You Around (Liberty Records, 1982)
 We've Got Tonight (Liberty Records, 1983)
 The Heart of the Matter (RCA Records, 1985)
With Patrice Rushen
 Prelusion (Prestige Records, 1974)
 Before the Dawn (Prestige Records, 1975)
 Pizzazz (Elektra Records, 1979)
 Posh (Elektra Records, 1980)
 Signature (Discovery, 1997)
With Santana
 Borboletta (Columbia, 1974)
 Amigos (Columbia, 1976)
With Lalo Schifrin
 No One Home (Tabu, 1979)
With Donna Summer
 Donna Summer (Geffen, 1982)
With Tina Turner
 Private Dancer (Capitol, 1984)
With Syreeta Wright
 Syreeta (Tamla Records, 1980)
 The Spell (Tamla Records, 1983)

Bibliography

References

External links

Ndugu Chancler interview at NAMM Oral History Program

1952 births
2018 deaths
African-American drummers
Deaths from cancer in California
Deaths from prostate cancer
Musicians from Shreveport, Louisiana
Jazz-funk drummers
Jazz-funk percussionists
American jazz drummers
American session musicians
Weather Report members
20th-century American drummers
American male drummers
American funk drummers
California State University, Dominguez Hills alumni
University of Southern California people
Jazz musicians from Louisiana
20th-century American male musicians
American male jazz musicians
20th-century African-American musicians
21st-century African-American people